SM U-104 was a German Type U 57 U-boat during the First World War. U-104 was built at AG Weser in Bremen, launched on 3 July 1917 and commissioned on 12 August 1917. She completed four patrols under Kptlt.

Loss
Later the same day  came upon her and dropped further depth-charges, sinking her and leaving but a single survivor of her 42-member crew. The wreckage lies at position .

Summary of raiding history

See also
 U-boat Campaign (World War I)

References

Notes

Citations

Bibliography

World War I submarines of Germany
Type U 57 submarines
Ships built in Bremen (state)
1917 ships
U-boats commissioned in 1917
Maritime incidents in 1918
U-boats sunk in 1918
U-boats sunk by depth charges
U-boats sunk by British warships